Melkonian or Melkonyan is a common family name of Armenian origin, literally meaning "son of Melkon" ("Melkon" is an Armenian given name).

It may refer to:

Persons:
 Ashot Melkonian (1930–2009), Armenian artist
 Babken Melkonyan (born 1980), Armenian snooker and pool player
 David Melkonian, public motivator and philanthropist
 Gennadi Melkonian (1944–2002), Soviet and Armenian film director
 James Melkonian, screenwriter and film director
 Lois Melkonian, former radio host and colleague of Dave Logan
 Markar Melkonian, scholar, brother of Monte Melkonian
 Melkon Melkonian, vice president of the Bulgarian Supreme Court
 Michael Melkonian (born 1948), German botanist
 Monte Melkonian (1957–1993), Armenian military commander
 Philippe Melkonian, musician, Clearlight bandmember
 Samvel Melkonyan (born 1984), Armenian football player
 Vartan Melkonian, British conductor of Lebanese-Armenian origin
 Harry Melkonian, Armenian American Law Professor 

Organizations:
 Melkonian Educational Institute, a school in Cyprus
 Monte Melkonian Fund, a California-registered charity organization

Armenian-language surnames